Searching for God Knows What is the third book by Donald Miller, published by Thomas Nelson, Inc., in 2004.  This work continues and expands many of the "Non-Religious Thoughts on Christian Spirituality" that appeared in his second book, Blue Like Jazz.  In Searching For God Knows What, Miller primarily focuses on his view that Christianity should not be approached as a formulaic "how-to" guide or moral checklist, but rather as an invitation to enter the only relationship that can provide ultimate fulfillment.

External links

2004 non-fiction books
Emerging church movement
Thomas Nelson (publisher) books